Ploski  is a village in the administrative district of Gmina Bielsk Podlaski, within Bielsk County, Podlaskie Voivodeship, in north-eastern Poland.

Etymology
The name of the village comes from "plosa" which means "Gulf".

History
The village was established in sixteenth century.

Places of worship

Transfiguration Church / Icons of Our Lady of Kazańskiej Chapel - Polish Orthodox

Built in the nineteenth century. On the left from the gate to the church is a small Chapel which was built in 1863.

Chapel of Saint Łukasz - Polish Orthodox

Cemetery chapel outside of town, built in 1955.

References

3 blas

Ploski